Sawi may refer to: 
Sawi people, a people of the West Papua province of Indonesia
Sawi language (Papuan), the language of the Sawi people
Sawi language (Dardic), an Indo-Aryan language of Afghanistan
Sawi District in Chumphon Province, Thailand
Sawi Mosque, the oldest mosque situated in Multan, Pakistan

See also 
 Savi (disambiguation)